Leaving is a 2011 Czech drama film written and directed by Václav Havel, based on his play of the same name, an absurdist look at the life of an ex-politician. The film received two Czech Lion awards.

Background
Leaving is the only film directed by former Czech president and playwright Václav Havel. It was released in cinemas on 24 March 2011, and broadcast by Czech Television on 18 December, the day of Havel's death.

The film received nominations in all major feature film categories in the 2011 Czech Lion Awards, winning two: Best Editing (Jiří Brožek) and Best Screenplay (Havel).

It was screened within the Forum section of the 2011 Berlinale and at the second Festival du film Czech-in, Paris.

Cast
 Josef Abrhám as Vilém Rieger
 Dagmar Havlová as Irena
 Vlasta Chramostová as Grandmother
 Eva Holubová as Monika
 Tatiana Vilhelmová as Vlasta
 Jan Budař as Albín
 Ivana Uhlířová as Zuzana
 Jiří Lábus as Hanus
 Roman Bloodworth as Občan Vaněk
 Oldřich Kaiser as Viktor
 Barbora Seidlová as Bea Weissenmütelhofová
 Stanislav Zindulka as Osvald
 Jiří Macháček as Jack
 Stanislav Milota as Bob
 Miroslav Krobot as Knobloch

References

External links
 

2011 films
2011 drama films
2011 directorial debut films
Czech drama films
2010s Czech-language films
Czech films based on plays
Czech Lion Awards winners (films)
Works by Václav Havel